Cameron 'Conkers' McConville (born 22 January 1974) is an Australian racing driver and motorsport celebrity. While retired from full-time competition, McConville still races occasionally and is an in-demand endurance event co-driver. McConville spent 14 years as a professional driver, ten of those in the largest Australian domestic category, Supercars Championship. McConville has also written for several magazines and presented several television programs and up until the end of the 2009 season was the colour commentator for Network Ten's Australian coverage of Formula One. McConville announced his retirement from full-time racing for the end of the 2009 season.  He is also rumoured to be The Stig in Top Gear Australia.

McConville now works with Porsche Centre Melbourne as the Motorsport Commercial Manager.

Early years 
McConville began his motor racing career at the age of eight racing go-karts in first local then national championships, culminating in several Victorian titles. At the age of fifteen, he became the youngest ever holder of a CAMS racing licence with a brief foray into Formula Vee racing before moving onto the highly competitive Formula Ford racing category in 1991. In 1992 he was chosen to be the 'works' Van Diemen driver and he won the prestigious Motorcraft Formula Ford Driver to Europe Series beating future champions such as Craig Lowndes and Steven Richards.

This victory (he was the youngest ever winner of the series) drew national attention and a testing role with Dick Johnson's Shell Ultra-hi Racing. McConville impressed Johnson and was included in the driver line up for the 1992 Tooheys 1000 in the team's second Ford Sierra RS500. McConville easily qualified the car, but in the wet conditions that marred the race it was decided to let the more experienced pair of Terry Shiel and Greg Crick handle the driving of the tricky, but powerful, turbocharged car.

His solid performance in practice at Bathurst meant he was invited back to DJR for the 1993 Tooheys 1000, where he paired with Paul Radisich in Shell team's second Ford EB Falcon V8. Unfortunately, whilst in third position, and under pressure from Tomas Mezera in the Holden Racing Team VP Commodore, McConville miscued going over Skyline, got the car sideways and clouted the wall, causing what turned out to be mostly cosmetic damage to the Falcon. However, the damage the #18 Shell car was done and Radisich/McConville would ultimately finish in 8th position, 10 laps behind the winning Larry Perkins/Gregg Hansford Commodore. McConville's crash at Mount Panorama proved to be costly to his rising career.

After several years of driving for lesser teams, his persistence finally paid off when he teamed up with prominent Melbourne businessman Tom Warwick to drive a Porsche 993 RSCS in the Australian GTP championship during the 1996 season. He won the series in the last race of the year beating championship favourite Jim Richards. In 1997 he was chosen to replace Greg Murphy as the Audi Australia 'works' driver (largely due to his success the previous year) where he finished third in the Australian Super Touring Championship. In 1998 he was narrowly beaten to the championship by team owner Brad Jones in somewhat controversial circumstances.

Supercars career 
An impressive part-time drive in the 1999 V8 Supercar championship saw the Holden Racing Team offer McConville an endurance co-drive, pairing up with the then championship leader Craig Lowndes. Together they finished in second place at the Bathurst 1000 race. This performance earned him a full-time contract with the newly expanded Rod Nash Racing for 2000. In 2001 he moved to the Sydney-based Lansvale racing team where he continued to impress in under-funded, less-developed machinery. He remained with the team until he was offered a contract with the Garry Rogers Motorsport outfit in 2004 after he was the outright winner of the Bathurst 24 hour race in 2002 in a Holden Monaro driving for the same team. The move to the Garry Rogers team proved fruitful for McConville when he took his first championship race win at Winton Raceway in 2004. In 2005 he took on team leader status at GRM with the departure of Garth Tander to the HSV dealer team. The following year, McConville was lured to Kees and Paul Weel's Supercheap Auto Racing outfit to pair with Greg Murphy after the retirement of Paul Weel in 2005.

In 2007, Cameron began a new motorsport reporting role with Channel Ten, including co-hosting the Formula One coverage.

In 2008, he joined up with his former boss Brad Jones to drive the number 14 Commodore after the team made the switch from Ford to Holden with the support of Walkinshaw Performance in the pursuit of better results. WOW Sight and Sound soon signed on as McConville's major sponsor for the 2008 championship. McConville immediately highlighted the new relationship with an excellent third at the Adelaide 500. After two mixed seasons McConville announced his decision to step down from full-time racing at the end of the season, the announcement came soon after a nasty crash at the Phillip Island 500K. During the off-season it was also announced that McConville would not be returning to his on-screen role with Channel 10 and McConville set up a business franchise in tyre retailing. A change in V8 Supercar endurance race regulations made McConville hot property as a co-driver in 2010 and he was quickly announced as a co-driver for the Holden Racing Team.

McConville stepped back into a race car at the 2010 Bathurst 12 Hour and co-drove a HSV R8 Tourer to third place. Subsequently, McConville picked up a drive in the 2010 Fujitsu V8 Supercar Series driving the Eggleston Motorsport Commodore which also enjoyed support from Holden Racing Team's parent organisation Walkinshaw Performance eager to get McConville additional racing prior to the 2010 endurance races. In the lead up to the 2010 Sucrogen Townsville 400, Lucas Dumbrell Motorsport announced that McConville would be replacing Daniel Gaunt in the team in the short term.

McConville was a last minute entrant for Team BOC at the Falken Tasmania Challenge of the 2011 V8 Supercars Championship. He replaced Jason Bright in Race 24, who withdrew after qualifying due to a rib injury. McConville started at the rear of the field and finished 19th.

Career results

Bathurst 1000 results

* Super Touring race

Complete Bathurst 24 Hour results

References

External links 
Holden Motorsport
Driver Database profile
Racing Reference profile

1974 births
Formula Ford drivers
Motorsport announcers
Racing drivers from Melbourne
Supercars Championship drivers
Living people
Barber Pro Series drivers
Australian Endurance Championship drivers
Garry Rogers Motorsport drivers
Audi Sport drivers
Dick Johnson Racing drivers